In British politics, the Shadow Home Secretary (formally known as the Shadow Secretary of State for the Home Department) is the person within the shadow cabinet who shadows the Home Secretary; this effectively means scrutinising government policy on home affairs including policing, national security, and matters of citizenship. The Shadow Home Secretary also formerly had responsibility for the criminal justice system and the prison service; these responsibilities are now held by the Shadow Justice Secretary. If the opposition party is elected to government, the Shadow Home Secretary often becomes the new Home Secretary, though this is not always the case.  The office has been held by Labour MP Yvette Cooper since 29 November 2021.

In recent decades, the positions of Home Secretary and Shadow Home Secretary have alternated between the Conservative and Labour parties. The corresponding position for the Liberal Democrats is the Liberal Democrat Home Affairs spokesperson.

List of Shadow Home Secretaries

References

Official Opposition (United Kingdom)